Thanks for Everything is a 1938 American comedy film directed by William A. Seiter, written by Curtis Kenyon and Harry Tugend, and starring Adolphe Menjou, Jack Oakie, Jack Haley, Arleen Whelan, Tony Martin and Binnie Barnes. It was released on December 23, 1938, by 20th Century Fox.

Plot

Cast      
Adolphe Menjou as J. B. Harcourt
Jack Oakie as Bates
Jack Haley as Henry Smith
Arleen Whelan as Madge Raines
Tony Martin as Tommy Davis
Binnie Barnes as Kay Swift
George Barbier as Joe Raines
Warren Hymer as Marine Sergeant
Gregory Gaye as Ambassador
Andrew Tombes as Mayor
Renie Riano as Mrs. Sweeney
Jan Duggan as Miss Twitchell
Charles Lane as Dr. Olson
Charles Trowbridge as Draft Doctor
Frank Sully as Lem Slininger
Gary Breckner as Announcer
Paul Hurst as Guard
James Flavin as Policeman
Edgar Dearing as Policeman Mike
Carol Adams As Bathing Beauty (uncredited)
Elvia Allman As Violinist (uncredited)
John Dilson As Mr. Lish (uncredited)
Bess Flowers As Radio Listener with Family	(uncredited)
Fred Kelsey As Police Desk Sergeant (uncredited)
Ruth Peterson As Secretary (uncredited) 
Arthur Rankin As Sound Effects Man (uncredited)

References

External links 
 

1938 films
1930s English-language films
20th Century Fox films
American comedy films
1938 comedy films
Films directed by William A. Seiter
American black-and-white films
1930s American films